The 1969 Whitewater State Warhawks football team was an American football team that represented Wisconsin State University—Whitewater (later renamed the University of Wisconsin–Whitewater) as a member of the Wisconsin State University Conference (WSUC) during the 1969 NAIA football season. In their 14th season under head coach Forrest Perkins, the Warhawks compiled an 8–1 record and tied for the WSUC championship.

Schedule

References 

Whitewater State
Wisconsin–Whitewater Warhawks football seasons
Whitewater State Warhawks football